South of Arizona is a 1938 American Western film directed by Sam Nelson and starring Charles Starrett, Iris Meredith and Bob Nolan.

Cast
 Charles Starrett as Clay Travers 
 Iris Meredith as Ann Madison 
 Bob Nolan as Bob - Travers Cowhand 
 Dick Curtis as Ed Martin 
 Robert Fiske as Mark Kenyon 
 Edmund Cobb as Henchman Dorn
 Art Mix as Henchman Santos 
 Dick Botiller as Henchman Latigo 
 Lafe McKee as Lafe Brown 
 Edward Coxen as Rancher Jed 
 Hank Bell as Hank - Stagecoach Driver 
 Sons of the Pioneers as Ranch Hands / Musicians

References

Bibliography
 Pitts, Michael R. Western Movies: A Guide to 5,105 Feature Films. McFarland, 2012.

External links
 

1938 films
1938 Western (genre) films
American black-and-white films
American Western (genre) films
Films directed by Sam Nelson
Columbia Pictures films
1930s English-language films
1930s American films